Mejiro Gym is a kickboxing gym headquartered in Amsterdam, the Netherlands. The gym is considered the "birthplace" of Dutch kickboxing.

History
Mejiro Gym was founded in 1978 by Jan Plas, a Dutch kickboxer who learned kickboxing from Kenji Kurosaki, a Japanese martial artist who founded the original Mejiro Gym in Mejiro, Tokyo. Vos Gym founder Johan Vos and FFC founder Lucien Carbin were among the founding members of Mejiro Gym Amsterdam.

With its well-known fighters including Rob Kaman and  Peter Aerts, Mejiro Gym has become one of the most famous and accomplished kickboxing gyms in the world. Mejiro is regarded as one of the "big three Kickboxing Gyms" in Netherlands, alongside Chakuriki and Vos Gym. Later, the Leeuwarden branch in Friesland, Netherlands was also established.

In 2020, Mejiro Gym opened a new branch in Bali, Indonesia.

Notable fighters

 Peter Aerts
 Ashwin Balrak
 Remy Bonjasky
 Sem Braan
 Lucien Carbin
 Erhan Deniz
 Cédric Doumbé
 Rodney Glunder
 Brice Guidon
 Rob Kaman
 Leo de Snoo
 Andre Mannaart
 Bob Schrijber
 Andy Souwer
 Michael Duut
 Fred Royers
 Dick Vrij
 Maurice Smith

References

External
Official website

1978 establishments in the Netherlands
Kickboxing training facilities
Kickboxing in the Netherlands
Sports venues in Amsterdam
20th-century architecture in the Netherlands